Algae eater or algivore is a common name for any bottom-dwelling or filter-feeding aquatic animal species that specialize in feeding on algae and phytoplanktons. Algae eaters are important for the fishkeeping hobby and many are commonly kept by aquarium hobbyists to improve water quality. They are also important primary consumers that relay the biomass and energy from photosynthetic autotrophes up into the food web, as well as protecting the aquatic ecosystem against algae blooms.

Freshwater

Fish
Some of the common and most popular freshwater aquarium algae eaters include:
 Many loricariid catfish of South America, such as genera Otocinclus, Ancistrus, and Plecostomus, constantly graze algae and biofilm, although many species of "plecos", which attain an adult length of over 10 inches, eat much less frequently as they near adulthood.
It is one of the only fish that will graze on "black brush algae" (freshwater Rhodophyta, or red algae), but even so will eat anything else in preference.
 Fishes of the genus Gyrinocheilus, family Gyrinocheilidae. There are three species in this genus with the Chinese algae eater, Gyrinocheilus aymonieri, the most common. Small specimens make good community fish but may become territorial when older.
American-flag fish, Jordanella floridae, are also dependable algae-eating fish. They are one of the only fish to graze on black brush algae, as with the siamese algae eater, and will also indiscriminately graze on other algae such as diatoms and hair algae. However, like all pupfish, they can be nippy to fish smaller or slower than them. Males can also be territorial.

Common freshwater algivorous fish:
 Loricariid
 Otocinclus, most often the common otocinclus.
 Ancistrus
 Plecostomus
 Cyprinid
 Siamese algae eater (Crossocheilus oblongus)
 Chinese algae eater (Gyrinocheilus aymonieri)
 Japanese white crucian carp (Carassius cuvieri)
 Silver carp (Hypophthalmichthys molitrix)
 Bighead carp (Hypophthalmichthys nobilis)
 Grass carp (Ctenopharyngodon idellus)

Shrimp
Some freshwater shrimp are also excellent algae eaters: 
 Almost all of them belong to the family Atyidae (the only family in the superfamily Atyoidea) including many genera
 Caridina:  red rhinoceros shrimp, bee shrimp, etc... One shrimp well known for its ability to clean an aquarium is the Amano Shrimp.
 Neocaridina: Neocaridina davidi (cherry shrimp), Neocaridina palmata, etc.
 Some of them belong to the genus Palaemonetes (grass shrimp)

Snails
Most species of freshwater snails, discounting most adult specimens of species belonging to the family Ampullariidae, which primarily subsist on aquatic plants as adults.

 Bellamyinae
 Lioplacinae
 Viviparinae

Saltwater
Some of the known types of fish to eat algae are blennies and tangs, but along with fish there are snails, crabs, and sea urchins who also eat algae. These species are known to eat red slime algae, green film algae, hair algae, diatoms, cyanobacteria, brown film algae, detritus, and microalgae.

Fish
There are several saltwater fish species that eat algae. Two of the major algae eaters are blennies and tangs. These fish eat red slime algae, green film algae, and hair algae. Some of the known species are as follows:

Blennies:

 Leopard Blenny
 High Fin Blenny
 Linear Blenny
 One Spot Blenny
 Sailfin Blenny
 Segmented Sail Fin Blenny
 Starry Blenny
 Tail Spot Blenny
 Two Spot Benny
 Seaweed Blenny

Tangs:

 Regal Blue Tang
 Blonde Naso Tang
 Red Sea Sailfin Tang
 Purple Tang
 Cheveron Tang
 Convict Tang
 Kole Tang
 Goldrim Tang
 Orangebar Tang
 Powder Blue Tang
 Yellow Tang

Crabs
Hermit crabs and other species of crabs eat algae. Crabs eat green algae, film algae, red slime algae, diatoms, cyanobacteria, and microalgae. Some of the known species are:

Hermit Crabs:                                                                                     

 Dwarf Blue Leg Hermit Crab
 Dwarf Red Tip Hermit Crab
 Electric Blue Hermit Crab
 Halloween Hermit Crab
 Hawaiian Zebra Hermit Crab
 Anemone Carrying Hermit Crab

Other Species:

 Arrow Crab
 Spotted Porcelain Crab
 Decorator Spider Crabs

Sea urchins
All species of sea urchin eat algae. They eat all sizes of algae, from something as small as macroalgae to something as large as kelp, and have been known to eat Coralline algae. In cooler waters, sea urchins have even been known to eat enough to control the size and compositions of kelp forests. Sea urchins act as scavengers and will also eat dead algae that they find. Some sea urchins, such as the variegated sea urchin or the red sea urchin, have become popular as pets for home aquariums because of their ability to proficiently eat algae.

Snails
Snails are known for eating hair algae, cyanobacteria, diatoms, green film algae, brown film algae, and detritus.

 Chestnut Cowrie Snail
 Zebra Turbo Snail
 Trochus Snails
 Mexican Turbo Snail
 Conch Snail
 Cerith Snail
 Orange Spot Butterscotch Nassarius Snail
 Lager Super Longan Nassarius
 Tropical balone
 Bumblebee Snails

References